The 2016 Bad Boy Off Road 300 was a NASCAR Sprint Cup Series race held on September 25, 2016, at New Hampshire Motor Speedway in Loudon, New Hampshire. Contested over 300 laps on the 1.058 mile (2.4 km) speedway, it was the 28th race of the 2016 NASCAR Sprint Cup Series season, second race of the Chase and second race of the Round of 16.

Report

Background

New Hampshire Motor Speedway is a  oval speedway located in Loudon, New Hampshire which has hosted NASCAR racing annually since the early 1990s, as well as an IndyCar weekend and the oldest motorcycle race in North America, the Loudon Classic.  Nicknamed "The Magic Mile", the speedway is often converted into a  road course, which includes much of the oval.

The track was originally the site of Bryar Motorsports Park before being purchased and redeveloped by Bob Bahre. The track is currently one of eight major NASCAR tracks owned and operated by Speedway Motorsports.

Entry list

First practice

Qualifying

He said afterwards that his team "just give me fast race cars. We worked in qualifying trim most of our first practice this weekend and now we have to translate that speed to a good race set-up for Sunday. We’d like to come out of here with the trophy and make our way to the next round of the Chase.”

Qualifying results

Practice (post-qualifying)

Second practice

Final practice

Race

First half

Under clear blue New Hampshire skies, Carl Edwards led the field to the green flag at 2:17 p.m. He held the led for 30 laps before Martin Truex Jr. ran him down to take the lead on lap 31. The first round of green flag stops started on lap 75. Truex pitted from the lead on lap 77 and handed it to Kyle Busch. He pitted on lap 79 and handed the lead to Brad Keselowski. He pitted on lap 80 and the lead cycled back to Truex.

Debris brought out the first caution of the race on lap 122.

The race restarted on lap 132. A spring rubber on the backstretch brought out the second caution of the race on lap 165.

Second half
The race restarted on lap 172. Matt Kenseth passed underneath Truex going into turn 3 to take the lead on lap 179. The final round of green flag stops began with 83 laps to go. Kenseth pitted from the lead with 69 laps to go and handed it to Keselowski. He pitted with 66 laps to go and handed the lead to Danica Patrick. Michael Annett getting into the wall in turn 2 brought out the third caution of the race with 60 laps to go. He went on to finish 40th. Patrick pitted under the caution and handed the lead back to Kenseth.

The race restarted with 52 laps to go. The fourth caution of the race flew with 36 laps to go after Michael McDowell suffered a left-rear tire blowout and spun out in turn 3. Edwards was sent to the tail end of the field on the restart for a commitment cone violation.

The race restarted with 32 laps to go. The fifth caution of the race flew with 16 laps to go after Trevor Bayne rear-ended the wall in turn 4.

The race restarted with 11 laps to go. The sixth caution flew with 10 laps to go after Ricky Stenhouse Jr. got turned by Paul Menard in turn 2.

The race restarted with six laps to go. Kevin Harvick beat Kenseth going into turn 3 to take the lead with five laps to go and drove on to score the victory.

Post-race

Driver comments
Harvick said in victory lane that the key "was just a smooth restart. I just didn’t want to spin the tires. I don’t know what happened to him, or if I just timed it right. It worked out good when we got to Turn 1.” He added that one of his "main goals this year was to not stretch ourselves out so bad. … The things that we’re doing are good enough to be competitive, and we just need to not make mistakes and go from there.”

Speaking about the final restart in the media center after the race, Kenseth said he "didn’t do a very good job. I let Kevin lay back on me and NASCAR said something about the restart before that and I have no idea what I did wrong. I probably shouldn’t have had that in my mind so I made sure I got rolling early and I spun the tires a little bit and he got half a car length anticipating it and just did it perfect and beat me through one and two and cleared me. It’s my fault. I shouldn’t have worried about what they (NASCAR) said and just got to turn one first.”

Race results

Race summary
 Lead changes: 8 among different drivers
 Cautions/Laps: 6 for 31
 Red flags: 0
 Time of race: 2 hours, 54 minutes and 15 seconds
 Average speed:

Media

Television
NBCSN covered the race on the television side. Rick Allen, Jeff Burton – the all-time wins leader at New Hampshire Motor Speedway with four wins – and Steve Letarte had the call in the booth for the race. Dave Burns, Mike Massaro, Marty Snider and Kelli Stavast handled pit road on the television side.

Radio
The Performance Racing Network had the radio call for the race, which was simulcast on Sirius XM NASCAR Radio.

Standings after the race

Drivers' Championship standings

Manufacturers' Championship standings

Note: Only the first 16 positions are included for the driver standings.

References

Bad Boy Off Road 300
Bad Boy Off Road 300
NASCAR races at New Hampshire Motor Speedway
Bad Boy Off Road 300